Shigeru Iitaka (飯高 茂 Iitaka Shigeru, born May 29, 1942, Chiba) is a Japanese mathematician at Gakushuin University working in algebraic geometry who introduced the Kodaira dimension and Iitaka dimension. He was a worldly leader in the field of Algebraic geometry.

He received in 1970 his Ph.D. from the University of Tokyo under Kunihiko Kodaira with thesis「代数多様体のD-次元について」(On D-dimensions of algebraic varieties). He was awarded the Iyanaga Prize of the Mathematical Society of Japan in 1980 
and the Japan Academy Prize in 1990.

References

External links
CV of Shigeru Iitaka

Living people
20th-century Japanese mathematicians
21st-century Japanese mathematicians
Algebraic geometers
1942 births
Academic staff of Gakushuin University